Roy Curvers (born 27 December 1979) is a Dutch former professional road cyclist, who competed professionally for  and its successors between 2008 and 2019. The winner of the Halle–Ingooigem race in 2011, Curvers now works as a directeur sportif for UCI WorldTeam .

Major results

2004
 9th Schaal Sels
2005
 8th Omloop van de Vlaamse Scheldeboorden
 9th Profronde van Fryslan
2006
 3rd Profronde van Fryslan
 9th Ronde van Drenthe
 9th Omloop der Kempen
 9th Rund um die Nürnberger Altstadt
 10th Classic Loire Atlantique
 10th Omloop van de Vlaamse Scheldeboorden
2007
 1st Stage 8 Olympia's Tour
 2nd Profronde van Fryslan
 4th Grote Prijs Stad Zottegem
 6th Ronde van Overijssel
 7th Ronde van het Groene Hart
 9th Nokere Koerse
 9th Delta Profronde
2008
 3rd Omloop van het Houtland
 9th Omloop van de Vlaamse Scheldeboorden
2009
 7th Ronde van Drenthe
 7th Kampioenschap van Vlaanderen
 9th Profronde van Fryslan
 9th Sparkassen Giro Bochum
2010
 8th Paris–Brussels
 10th Overall Circuit Franco-Belge
2011
 1st Halle–Ingooigem
 7th Sparkassen Giro Bochum
 8th Omloop van het Houtland
 9th Paris–Tours
2013
 4th GP Impanis-Van Petegem
 5th Overall World Ports Classic
 5th Grote Prijs Jef Scherens
2015
 5th Kampioenschap van Vlaanderen
 10th Binche–Chimay–Binche

Grand Tour general classification results timeline

References

External links

1979 births
Living people
Dutch male cyclists
People from Leudal
Cyclists from Limburg (Netherlands)